Andrew Murray Gurr (born 7 August 1944) is a British retired politician who served as the Governor of Saint Helena from 2007 to 2011. He took up office on 11 November 2007 in a ceremony in Jamestown at which he declared his commitment to Saint Helena and dependencies in his inaugural speech. He took over from Michael Clancy with Chief Secretary Martin Hallam serving as acting Governor in the interim.

He served as Chief Executive of the Falkland Islands Government from 1994 to 1999.

In moves towards creating a more open form of Government in St Helena, since taking office in November 2007, Governor Gurr swiftly abolished the predominantly expatriate 'Senior Management Team' committee that had arisen within the St Helena Government, citing that "It has appeared to some as though this team has been making decisions and there can be little doubt that that would be unconstitutional", and immediately introduced a formal Press Report after each session of the Executive Council, summarising the main points discussed by members from both the open and closed (to the general public) sessions.

Family

Andrew Gurr and his wife, Jean, resided on Saint Helena during his term of office.

References

|-

Chief Executives of the Falkland Islands
Governors of Saint Helena
British colonial governors and administrators in the Americas

British colonial governors and administrators in Africa
Living people
Place of birth missing (living people)
1944 births